Morda Road is a cricket ground in Oswestry, Shropshire.  The first recorded match on the ground was in 1964, when Shropshire played their first Minor Counties Championship match at the ground against the Somerset Second XI.  From 1964 to 2000, the ground  hosted 18 Minor Counties Championship matches.  From 2000 to present, the ground has 6 MCCA Knockout Trophy matches.

The ground has also held a single List-A match between Shropshire and  Northumberland in the 2004 Cheltenham & Gloucester Trophy which was played in 2003.

In local domestic cricket, Morda Road is the home ground of Oswestry Cricket Club who play in the Birmingham and District Premier League Division Three.

References

External links
Morda Road on CricketArchive
Morda Road on Cricinfo

Cricket grounds in Shropshire
Sports venues completed in 1964
Oswestry